Rhizoclosmatium is a genus of fungi classified in the family Chytriomycetaceae. It was circumscribed by Danish mycologist Henning Eiler Petersen in 1903. The genus contains four species.

References

External links

Chytridiomycota genera